Peter Liebers (born 16 April 1988) is a German former competitive figure skater. He is the 2015 Winter Universiade champion, the 2010 Nebelhorn Trophy bronze medalist, the 2012 Ice Challenge champion, and a six-time German national champion. He placed eighth at the 2014 Winter Olympics in Sochi and as high as sixth at the European Championships (2014 and 2015).

Personal life 
Peter Liebers was born on 16 April 1988 in Berlin. He is the son of Mario Liebers and the younger brother of Martin Liebers, both of whom competed internationally in figure skating. He speaks German and English.

In the summer of 2014, he married German former competitive figure skater Denise Zimmermann. On May 1, 2015, Zimmermann gave birth to the couple's first child, a son named Emil.

Career

Early years 
Liebers began skating in 1994. He won the 2002 German junior national title and competed in four seasons of the ISU Junior Grand Prix series. He finished 13th at the 2006 World Junior Championships but, while practicing following the event, he broke his left leg when he hit a rut in the ice. As a result, he missed the 2006–07 season and had a metal insert in his leg until March 2007, returning to the ice in May.

2007–08 to 2012–13 
In 2008, Liebers finished 13th in his debut at the European Championships and 32nd at the World Championships. The next season, he competed at two senior Grand Prix events and won his first German senior national title.

In the 2010–11 season, Liebers won bronze at the 2010 Nebelhorn Trophy and competed at two Grand Prix events. He finished 11th at the 2011 Europeans and 15th at the 2011 Worlds.

In June 2011, Liebers broke his sacrum while working on a new program in Toronto, Canada. He won the silver medal at the 2011 NRW Trophy and bronze at the 2012 Coupe Internationale de Nice. Liebers finished tenth at the 2013 European Championships and eleventh at the 2013 World Championships. It was the best World result of his career and qualified a spot for Germany in men's singles at the 2014 Winter Olympics.

2013–14 season
Liebers placed a career-best sixth at the 2014 European Championships in Budapest. In February 2014, he was training six to seven hours a day. At the Olympics in Sochi, he represented Germany in the team event short program and then finished eighth in the separate men's event. In March, he competed in Saitama, Japan at the 2014 World Championships, where he placed 14th.

2014–15 season
Having fallen and broken his left shoulder while working on a modified spin, Liebers underwent an operation in the second half of August 2014. Estimated to lose up to eight weeks following the operation, he withdrew from the 2014 Cup of China. He later withdrew from his second Grand Prix assignment, the 2014 NHK Trophy, and the German Championships. In January 2015, he took bronze at the Toruń Cup and finished sixth at the European Championships in Stockholm, Sweden. The following month, he won gold at the Winter Universiade in Granada, having climbed from fourth in the short program to finish ahead of Takahiko Kozuka and Artur Gachinski.

2015–16 season
Liebers began his season on the ISU Challenger Series (CS), placing 5th at the 2015 Nebelhorn Trophy. He dropped out of his next CS event, the 2015 Finlandia Trophy, due to an adductor strain and later withdrew from his GP assignments, the 2015 Skate Canada International and the 2015 Rostelecom Cup, and the German Championships for the same reason. On 20 December 2015, the Deutsche Presse-Agentur reported that Liebers had ended his season, the injury being more serious than initially thought. As a result of a gap in the acetabulum, caused by a fall, he underwent an arthroscopic operation on 23 February 2016 and was expected to rest for six weeks.

Programs

Competitive highlights 
GP: Grand Prix; CS: Challenger Series; JGP: Junior Grand Prix

Seasons: 2007–2008 to present

Seasons: 1999–2000 to 2005–2006

References

External links 

 

German male single skaters
1988 births
Living people
Figure skaters from Berlin
Figure skaters at the 2014 Winter Olympics
Olympic figure skaters of Germany
Universiade medalists in figure skating
Universiade gold medalists for Germany
Competitors at the 2015 Winter Universiade